Sebastiano Visconti Prasca (23 January 1883, Rome – 25 February 1961) was an Italian general. He led the initial offensive of the Greco-Italian War, but was relieved of his command after two weeks for incompetence and substituted with General Ubaldo Soddu.

Biography
Sebastiano Visconti Prasca was a member of the noble family of the House of Visconti. He took part in World War I, receiving two commemorative medals and a Merit Cross.

Starting from 1924, he served as   military attache at Belgrade in Yugoslavia. In 1934 he commanded the Italian corps in Saar. Later he was military attaché at Paris and Berlin, and, in 1938, he became commander of the 2nd Cavalry Division Emanuele Filiberto Testa di Ferro.

In 1940  he was commander-in-chief of the lackluster Italian invasion of Greece. Visconti Prasca's personal propaganda in convincing Benito Mussolini that the initial forces under his command would prove sufficient, and that the Italian invasion would meet a feeble resistance, was one of the factors leading to the disaster. Visconti Prasca was replaced on 13 November, only two weeks after the beginning of the invasion, by Ubaldo Soddu.

In September 1943 he joined the Italian resistance movement. Captured by the Germans, he was sentenced to death, subsequently commuted to life imprisonment in Germany. Visconti Prasca escaped and fought with the Red Army in the final stages of World War II, participating in the battle of Berlin.

In 1946 he published a memoir, Io ho aggredito la Grecia, in which he tried to justify his personal errors in the War of Greece.

References

Sources

1883 births
1961 deaths
Military personnel from Rome
Sebastiano Prasca
Nobility from Rome
Italian generals
Italian military personnel of World War II
Greco-Italian War
Italian resistance movement members
Italian prisoners sentenced to death
Prisoners sentenced to death by Germany
Italian prisoners sentenced to life imprisonment
Prisoners sentenced to life imprisonment by Germany